Jed is the second studio album by American rock band Goo Goo Dolls, released on February 22, 1989 by Metal Blade Records. It was the band's first album in which John Rzeznik sang vocals for some of the tracks; the majority of the songs are sung by Robby Takac, with Rzeznik taking over for two ("Up Yours" and "James Dean"). The album was named after painter Jed Jackson, who was Robby Takac's art teacher at Medaille College and who painted the cover artwork, which is entitled "Arkansas Sunset".

Track listing

Personnel
Robby Takac - lead vocals, bass guitar
Johnny Rzeznik - lead guitar, backing vocals, lead vocals on "Up Yours" and "James Dean"
George Tutuska - drums
Additional personnel
 Lance Diamond - lead vocals on track 7

References

Goo Goo Dolls albums
1989 albums
Metal Blade Records albums
Punk rock albums by American artists